Roger de Lacy (died after 1106) was an Anglo-Norman nobleman, a Marcher Lord on the Welsh border. Roger was a castle builder, particularly at Ludlow Castle.

Lands and titles 
From Walter de Lacy (died 1085) he inherited Castle Frome, Herefordshire. The Domesday Survey (1086) shows Roger holding also Ocle Pychard, Almeley Castle, Eardisley Castle, Icomb Place and Edgeworth Manor. He had an insecure lordship at Ewias Lacy now known as Longtown Castle on the modern day Welsh border., in Longtown, Herefordshire; Stanton Lacy was probably also his after Walter. His main stronghold was Weobley. He held directly from the King. De Lacy also held 1.5 salthouses in Droitwich.

Rebel Baron 
He took part in the rebellion of 1088 against William Rufus, with the other local lords Osbern fitzRichard of Richard's Castle, Ralf of Mortemer, and Bernard of Neufmarche. He was later implicated in the conspiracy of 1095 against William, and was exiled.

Legacy of family conflict 
Weobley passed to his brother Hugh de Lacy who died before 1115 when the de Lacy lands passed to Pain fitzJohn. Roger's son Gilbert de Lacy spent much effort recovering the Longtown and Ludlow holdings.

References

Bibliography

Remfry, P.M., Longtown Castle, 1048 to 1241
Remfry, P.M., The Castles of Ewias Lacy, 1048 to 1403

Roger
Anglo-Normans
History of Ludlow
11th-century English landowners
William II of England
English rebels